Mud wrestling is defined as physical confrontation (fighting, wrestling, etc.) that occurs in mud or a mud pit. The popular modern interpretation specifies that participants wrestle while wearing minimal clothing and usually going barefoot, with the emphasis on presenting an entertaining spectacle as opposed to physically injuring or debilitating the opponent to the point where they are unable to continue the match.

History

The first professional mud wrestling organization was formed in Akron, Ohio in the 1930s by Michael Wittrock and Tyler Carroll. The first women's match occurred there on 7 January 1938.

See also
Catfight
Intergender wrestling

References

Sports entertainment